Peter Grajciar (born 17 September 1983) is a Slovak football midfielder who plays for Czech club AFK Slivenec.

Career

International career
His international debut came in second half of the Slovakia vs. Croatia friendly match on 16 October 2007.

Later career
In July 2019, Grajciar was appointed as a playing assistant manager for the B-team of FC Viktoria Plzeň under manager Pavel Horvath. He left the position on 10 March 2020 and joined 1. FK Příbram, once again under manager Pavel Horvath. They left the club one year later, in March 2021. During 2020, Grajciar also played for AFK Slivenec.

In July 2021, Grejciar joined German Landesliga Bayern-Mitte club 1. FC Bad Kötzting.

International goals

Honours
Slavia Prague
Gambrinus liga: 2008-09
Dinamo Tbilisi
Georgian Premier League: 2012–13
Georgian Cup: 2012–13

References

External links
  
 
 
 

1983 births
Living people
Sportspeople from Zvolen
Association football midfielders
Slovak footballers
Slovak expatriate footballers
Slovakia international footballers
Slovakia under-21 international footballers
FC Nitra players
SK Slavia Prague players
Konyaspor footballers
AC Sparta Prague players
Slovak Super Liga players
Czech First League players
Süper Lig players
Erovnuli Liga players
Śląsk Wrocław players
Ekstraklasa players
1. FK Příbram players
SK Dynamo České Budějovice players
FC Sellier & Bellot Vlašim players
FC Dinamo Tbilisi players
Slovak expatriate sportspeople in Georgia (country)
Slovak expatriate sportspeople in Poland
Slovak expatriate sportspeople in the Czech Republic
Slovak expatriate sportspeople in Turkey
Slovak expatriate sportspeople in Germany
Expatriate footballers in Georgia (country)
Expatriate footballers in the Czech Republic
Expatriate footballers in Turkey
Expatriate footballers in Poland
Expatriate footballers in Germany